The hasta ( (hásta); ) is a traditional Indian unit of length, measured from the elbow to the tip of the middle finger. It equals 24 aṅgulas orﾠ about 18 inches, about 45 centimetres.

4 hastas make one dhanus, and 400 hastas make one nalva. 8 hastas make one rajju.

See also 
 Cubit

Notes

Units of length
Customary units in India